The Ethnocacerist movement (also sometimes referred to as the Movimiento Nacionalista Peruano or "Peruvian Nationalist Movement") is a Peruvian ethnic nationalist movement that espouses an ideology called ethnocacerism. The movement seeks to establish a proletarian dictatorship led by the country's Indigenous communities and their descendants. It draws on the ideas and history of Indigenous and anticolonial movements, including those of Juan Velasco Alvarado, Evo Morales, Abdel Nasser, Muammar Gaddafi, and Che Guevara. Ethnocacerism is considered an Indigenist ideology and is currently represented in mainstream politics by the Union for Peru party and other smaller parties. The ideology is followed by Peruvian militant groups like Asociación Plurinacional de Reservistas del Tahuantinsuyo and Ejército de Reservistas Andino Amazónico – T.

The name "ethnocacerism" is composed of two parts: the first evokes Peru's ethnic identity (specifically, its origins with the Quechua, a Native Peruvian people often identified in the popular imagination with the Inca, a pre-Columbian royal group); the second indicates the movement's veneration of 19th century president and war hero Andrés Avelino Cáceres, who led a guerrilla resistance campaign against occupying Chilean troops during the War of the Pacific. Due to the latter, the movement also demands the return of the territories of Arica and Tarapacá that were lost to Chile in the war.

Many members of the movement are armed forces veterans of Peru's internal wars or the border disputes with Ecuador in the 1980s and 1990s.

History

Origins 
The ideas of ethnocacerism originated from lawyer Isaac Humala and its practice as a doctrine was begun by his sons Ollanta Humala and Antauro Humala in 1987 during the Internal War against the Shining Path. Etnocacerism began as a military doctrine and organizing strategy, not a political doctrine, that was contesting the military doctrine and strategic errors of the Peruvian armed forces, which viewed the Indigenous countryside as a foreign territory and colony. Ollanta Humala explains that Etnocacerism began from the personal experiences of soldiers on the field in clandestine study groups. While critical of high military and political officials, it was not a conspiratorial movement against these official. Rather, Etnocacerism was developed to be an effective military doctrine that spoke to the experiences of Indigenous peoples (Quechua, Aymara, Amazonians), viewed the war as much a political campaign as a military one, and would win over Indigenous peoples in contested territories against the Shining Path.

Isaac Humala founded the Instituto de Estudios Etnogeopolíticos (IEE) in 1989 to serve as an ethnocacerist think tank and then publishing company in Peru.

Locumba Uprising 
Ethnocacerism becomes a political doctrine following an uprising in Locumba, Tacna, on 29 October 2000, led by the Humala brothers. The goal was the overthrow of Alberto Fujimori from the presidency over the "vladi-video" corruption scandal where Vladimiro Montesinos, the head of the National Intelligence Service, was caught on video bribing a congressman on the opposition to defect and join Fujimori's party. The brothers surrendered on 16 December and were pardoned by congress six days later, with the event being praised by Peruvian media due to its anti-Fujimorist nature, though the political views of the brothers were largely overlooked.

Andahuaylazo 

Antauro gained international prominence on 1 January 2005 by occupying a rural police station in Andahuaylas, Apurimac, an action dubbed El Andahuaylazo. Four police officers and one gunman died on the first day of the siege. The following day Humala agreed to surrender, though had still failed to do so by the third day, claiming that the government had reneged on its promise to guarantee a "surrender with honour". Eventually he surrendered and was taken to Lima under arrest on 4 January 2005 and was sentenced to 19 years in prison, expected to be released in 2024.

Contemporary history 
The current political party adopting ethnocacerism is Union for Peru. Union for Peru was the main party that spearheaded the impeachment movement that resulted in the removal of Martín Vizcarra from Peru's presidency, with Antauro organizing his followers in congress through phone calls and prison visits. Antauro was banned from contacting others from prison following this incident.

In 2018, members of the ethnocacerist movement formed an alliance with the Militarized Communist Party of Peru, called the United Democratic Andean Revolutionary Front of Peru (.

Ideology 
The movement has been described as having fascist traits, with Vice summarizing ethnocacerism as "an idiosyncratic mix of economic populism, xenophobia — especially towards Peru's southern neighbor Chile — and the mythologizing of the supposed racial superiority of 'copper skinned' Andeans. It also takes an old school machista view of women’s rights while Isaac Humala, ... called for the summary shooting of homosexuals and corrupt officials". The movement's newspaper Ollanta (later named Antauro), according to Harper's Magazine, was where "[a]nti-Semitic, anti-Chilean 'news' ran alongside xenophobic editorials". Etnocacerists call for 25% of children to belong to the state to be utilized as a military conscripts. Anthropologist Norma Correa of the Pontifical Catholic University of Peru stated "Supposedly, ethnocacerism is about inclusion, but really it excludes so many citizens in a society as diverse as [Peru's], ... It’s not just whites. Ethnocacerism has no place for Afro-Peruvians, Amazonian natives or even mestizos".

Ethnocacerists distinguish themselves from both the political right-wing (Free Markets, Liberalism) and "Eurocentric" left-wing (European radical theories, Marxist doctrine) in Peru, saying they oppose capitalism, fascism, and Marxism, arguing instead that they intend to create an organic indigenous ideology based on Peru's historical civilizations. Their use of the slogan "ni derecha ni izquierda" traces itself to Juan Velasco Alvarado's military government which was unaligned to either the United States (First World) or Soviet Union (Second World). This position of non-alignment and Third-Worldism meant looking for solutions in Peruvian and Latin American history, such as the rebel hero Tupac Amaru and writer José Carlos Mariátegui. Anticolonial policies are still advocated by Antauro Humala and the Etnocacerists.

Territorial views 
Following from his rejection of Peruvian nationalism, Antauro has pronounced himself against Peru's borders as colonial impositions traced back to Spanish colonization. A common slogan of his ethnic nationalism is that Peruvian nationalism wants to “reclaim the word ‘Peru’” while his ethnic nationalism wants to reclaim “the concept of tawantinsuyo” (the Quechua name for the Inca Empire), because “as an ethnic nationalist, I cannot respect criollo borders, because when I reclaim Tawantinsuyo, my ancestral homeland encompasses Tucumán (Argentina) all the way to Pasto (Colombia). We are a single people disseminated amongst various criollo states”.

Antauro calls the Andeans countries and regions “the Inkan International” (La Internacional Inkaica) showing solidarity with Bolivians, Ecuadorians, and the Andean regions of Southwestern Colombia, Northwestern Argentina, and Northern Chile. The territorial views of ethnocacerists would expand Peru's population from around 30 million to over 100 million people.

Ethnocacerists supported Evo Morales's re-election to the presidency in 2019 and condemned the removal of Morales as "fascist" and "neocolonialist".

See also 
 Ollanta Humala
 Chilenophobia
 Locumba uprising (es)
 Peruvian Nationalist Party
 Union for Peru
 Go on Country
 National Alliance of Workers, Farmers, University Students and Reservists
 Peru Wins
 Indigenism
 National Bolshevism

References

External links
L'un des frères Humala sera-t-il le Hugo Chávez du Pérou? (latinreporters.com; in French)
Quiénes son los etnocaceristas (BBC; in Spanish)
Ollanta Humala habla con la BBC (BBC; in Spanish)

Anti-Chilean sentiment
Ethnic supremacy
Ethnocentrism
Guerrilla movements in Latin America
Indigenist political parties in South America
Indigenous nationalism in the Americas
Indigenous politics in South America
Nationalist movements in South America
Peruvian nationalism
Ideologies
Far-left politics in Peru
Political movements in Peru
Rebel groups in Peru
Third Position